Lazarus is a given name and surname. It is derived from the Hebrew אלעזר, Elʿāzār (Eleazar) meaning "God has helped".

People named Lazarus

In Christianity
 Lazarus of Bethany, a figure described as being raised from the dead by Jesus in the Gospel according to John
 Lazarus, a figure from the parable of the Rich man and Lazarus in the Gospel according to Luke
 Lazarus of Persia (died 326), martyr of the Christian church
 Lazarus of Aix (died 441), Christian bishop of Aix-en-Provence
 Lazarus (bishop of Milan), from 438 to 449, a saint in the Catholic Church
 Lazarus Zographos (died 867), Christian saint

People with the given name Lazarus
 Lazarus Joseph (1891–1966), NY State Senator and New York City Comptroller
 Lazarus "Larry" Zeidel (1928–2014), Canadian ice hockey player
 Lazarus (rapper), American rapper, songwriter and physician
 Lazarus Chigwandali, Malawian musician
 Lazarus Nkala (1927–1975), Rhodesian political activist
 Lazarus Chakwera, Malawian President

People with the surname Lazarus
 Abraham Lazarus (1911–1967), British politician
 Arnold Lazarus (1932–2013), South African-born clinical psychologist 
 Bob Lazarus (1956–2009), American comedian
 Catie Lazarus (1976–2020), American comedian and writer
 Celestine Lazarus (born 1992), Nigerian footballer 
 Charles Lazarus (1923–2018), American businessman, founder of Toys "R" Us
 Daniel Barnet Lazarus (1866–1932), Australian politician
 Edward Lazarus (born 1959), American author and lawyer
 Emma Lazarus (1849–1887), American poet
 Fred Lazarus Jr. (1884–1973), American businessman
 Glenn Lazarus (born 1965), Australian politician and former rugby league footballer
 Henry Lazarus (1815–1895), British clarinettist
 John Lazarus (born 1947), Canadian playwright
 Joseph Lazarus (1903–1943), US Olympic boxer
 Leon Lazarus (1919–2008), comics writer
 M. E. Lazarus (1822–1895), American anarchist
 Mark Lazarus (born 1938), English football player
 Mell Lazarus (1927–2016), American cartoonist
 Moritz Lazarus (1824–1903), German philosopher
 Richard Lazarus (1922–2002), psychologist and creator of the coping theory
 Richard Lazarus, professor of law at the Harvard Law School
 Stephanie Lazarus (born 1960), American police officer convicted of murdering a romantic rival

Fictional characters
 Lazarus, a character in Jesus' parable of the Rich man and Lazarus

 Lazarus, a character in the film Black Snake Moan

 Lazarus, a fictional machine in the film Casper
 Lazarus, a character in video game Evolve
 Lazarus, a fictional virus in the TV series Sanctuary
 Lazarus, a character in the Star Trek TOS episode "The Alternative Factor" (1967)
 Lazarus Churchyard, a character in the comic series of the same name
 Archbishop Lazarus in video game Diablo
 Dr. Lazarus, a character in the film Galaxy Quest
 Kirk Lazarus in the film Tropic Thunder
 Dr. Marian Lazarus, a character in the film Outland
 Sister Mary Lazarus in the musical Sister Act
 Professor Richard Lazarus in the Doctor Who episode "The Lazarus Experiment"
 Rina Lazarus, a character created by Faye Kellerman
 Lazarus Long, creator of the New Utopia scam
 Lazarus Long, a character created by Robert Heinlein
 Robert MacNichol (Lazarus) from Blair Witch Volume II: The Legend of Coffin Rock
 Lazarus, a character in the game The Binding of Isaac (video game)
 Project Lazarus, name of project of restoring Commander Shepard in Mass Effect 2

See also
 Lazar (name)
 Lazare (disambiguation)
 Lazarus (disambiguation)

References

Given names